Werner Thissen (born 3 December 1938) is a German prelate of the Roman Catholic Church. He served as Archbishop of Hamburg from 2002 until 2014 when he resigned and became Archbishop Emeritus of Hamburg.

Biography
Born in Kleve, Thissen was ordained to the priesthood in Münster on 29 June 1966.

On 16 April 1999 he was appointed Auxiliary Bishop of Münster and Titular Bishop of Scampa. Thissen received his episcopal consecration on the following 24 May from Bishop Reinhard Lettmann, with Bishops Alfons Demming and Heinrich Janssen serving as co-consecrators.

He was named Archbishop of Hamburg by Pope John Paul II on 22 November 2002; he was installed as such on 25 January 2003.

References

External links

Archdiocese of Hamburg - in German
Catholic-Hierarchy

1938 births
Living people
Archbishops of Hamburg
20th-century Roman Catholic archbishops in Germany
21st-century Roman Catholic archbishops in Germany
People from Kleve
Members of the European Academy of Sciences and Arts
20th-century German Roman Catholic priests